The Syro-Malabar Catholic Archeparchy of Trichur-Palayoor, in Thrissur District of Central Kerala, India, with nearly half a million Syro-Malabar Catholics now, used to be the largest Catholic diocese in India when it included the Syro-Malabar Catholic Diocese of Irinjalakuda until 1978 and Syro-Malabar Catholic Eparchy of Palghat until 1973. Syro-Malabar Catholic Diocese of Irinjalakuda, also located in Thrissur District, has over a quarter million Syro-Malabar Catholics now. Syro-Malabar Catholic Diocese of Palghat in Central Kerala extends to some regions in the neighbouring state of Tamil Nadu. In 2010, the parts of Tamil Nadu under the Syro-Malabar Catholic Diocese of Palghat were separated to form another Syro-Malabar Catholic Diocese of Ramanathapuram.

Archeparchy of Trichur-Palayoor founded on 20 May 1887 by Pope Leo XIII by his Papal bull Quod Jam Pridem now covers an area of 2000 Sq.Km and has a Catholic population of about 460848. There are 16 Foranes under the Archeparchy of Trichur. The total number of parishes is 215. In addition, there are 36 stations in the archdiocese. Diocese of Ramanathapuram, Diocese of Irinjalakuda and Diocese of Palghat are the suffragan dioceses of the Archeparchy. Cardinal Mar George Alencherry is the Major Archbishop of the Syro-Malabar Catholic Church, Mar Andrews Thazhath is the Metropolitan Archbishop, Mar Tony Neelankavil is the Auxiliary Bishop of the Archdiocese and Mar Jacob Thoomkuzhy is the Archbishop Emeritus.

History
The diocese was founded on 20 May 1887 by Pope Leo XIII by his papal bull Quod iam pridem. The boundaries of diocese were from Periyar (river) in Aluva to Bharathappuzha. Later it was extended to Palakkad district and extended to Coimbatore District in Tamil Nadu and was the largest Catholic diocese in India.

Role in education
Rev. Medlycott has given a description about the state of facilities for education in the vicariate on his arrival in 1887 and on his return in 1896 as below:

Parishes and population
The total number of parishes is 215. In addition, there are 36 stations in the archdiocese. The population of Syro-Malabar Catholics in Thrissur Archdiocese is about 4,60,848. There are 16 foranes under Thrissur Archdiocese. They are:

Suffragan dioceses
 Syro-Malabar Catholic Diocese of Ramanathapuram
 Syro-Malabar Catholic Diocese of Irinjalakuda
 Syro-Malabar Catholic Diocese of Palghat

Vicars Apostolic 
 Mar Adolph Medlycott (1887 − 1896)
 Mar John Menachery (1896 − 1919)

Bishops
 Mar Francis Vazhapilly (1919 − 1944)
 Mar George Alapatt (1944 − 1970)

Archbishops
 Mar Joseph Kundukulam (1970 − 1997)
 Mar Jacob Thoomkuzhy (1997 − 2007)
 Mar Andrews Thazhath (2007 −)

Saints and causes for canonisation
 St. Euphrasia Eluvathingal
 St. Maria Theresa Chiramel
 Ven. Augustine John Ukken
 Ven. Joseph Vithayathil
 Servant of God Fr. Antony Thachuparambil
 Servant of God Sr. Maria Celine Kannanaikal, UMI

References

External links
 Archdiocese of Thrissur

 
Thrissur
Thrissur
Dioceses in Kerala
Religious organizations established in 1887
Roman Catholic dioceses and prelatures established in the 19th century
Organisations based in Thrissur
1887 establishments in British India
Churches in Thrissur district